Achmad Rifai (born on November 17, 1984) is an Indonesian footballer who currently plays for Persepam Madura United in the Indonesia Super League.

References

External links

1984 births
Association football midfielders
Living people
Indonesian footballers
Liga 1 (Indonesia) players
Indonesian Premier Division players
PSIM Yogyakarta players
Persepam Madura Utama players
Place of birth missing (living people)